Daniel Larned Davis Granger (May 30, 1852 – February 14, 1909) was a U.S. Representative from Rhode Island and mayor of Providence, Rhode Island.

Early and personal life
Granger was born May 30, 1852 in Providence, Rhode Island, to Dr. James N. and Anna Brown Davis Granger. Granger attended public schools.

He was graduated from Brown University, Providence, Rhode Island, in 1874 and from the law department of Boston University in 1877. In 1902 Brown awarded Granger an A.M. (Master's) degree.

Granger never married. He lived at 328 Thayer Street.

Granger belonged to numerous organizations. He was a member of the Rhode Island Historical Society; president of the Churchman's Club of Rhode Island; vice president of the American Group of Inter-parliamentary Union for the Promotion of International Arbitration; treasurer of the Dorilton Corporation of New York; member of the Psi Upsilon; member of the University Club of Providence, and the Manhattan Club of New York.

Law career
He was admitted to the bar in 1877 and commenced practice in Providence, Rhode Island. He was reading clerk of the State house of representatives 1887-1890, and treasurer of Providence from January 1890 to January 1901.

Political career
He served as mayor of Providence in 1901 and 1902.

Granger was elected as a Democrat to the Fifty-eighth, Fifty-ninth, and Sixtieth Congresses and served from March 4, 1903, until his death in Washington, D.C., February 14, 1909.

Death and burial
Granger took sick in November 1908 in Albany. He was moved to New York City and then Washington, DC. By January 2, his condition became serious, and he died in Washington at 7:15 PM on February 14. The cause was heart failure. His funeral took place in Providence, and he was interred in Swan Point Cemetery in Providence, Rhode Island.

See also
List of United States Congress members who died in office (1900–49)

References

External links
 

Daniel L.D. Granger, late a Representative from Rhode Island, Memorial addresses delivered in the House of Representatives and Senate frontispiece 1909
 
	
	

Mayors of Providence, Rhode Island
1852 births
1909 deaths
Brown University alumni
Boston University School of Law alumni
Burials at Swan Point Cemetery
Democratic Party members of the United States House of Representatives from Rhode Island
Rhode Island lawyers
19th-century American politicians